Tremont High School is a school located in Tremont, Illinois.

The school has an enrollment of 346 students.

In 2006 the school won the Blue Ribbon Award.

References

Public high schools in Illinois
Schools in Tazewell County, Illinois